Brian Skabar (born February 25, 1952) is a Canadian politician, who was elected to the Nova Scotia House of Assembly in the 2009 provincial election. Skabar won the riding of Cumberland North for the New Democratic Party. He obtained 40 per cent of the popular vote and was the first NDP candidate ever elected in the district.

A resident of Amherst since 1988, Skabar is a retired public servant. He spent the majority of his government career as a social worker and also in management positions with Health Canada and Indigenous & Northern Affairs Canada, formerly known as Indian & Northern Affairs Canada.

On June 29, 2009, Skabar was appointed Ministerial Assistant to the Nova Scotia Office of Aboriginal Affairs, and on March 15, 2013 he was appointed Ministerial Assistant of Intergovernmental Relations and Nova Scotia/New Brunswick Co-operation.

In the 2013 election, Skabar finished third in Cumberland North, losing the seat to Liberal Terry Farrell.

In the 2016 Amherst municipal election Skabar ran for mayor, however he lost to David Kogan.

References

1952 births
Living people
Nova Scotia New Democratic Party MLAs
People from Amherst, Nova Scotia
Politicians from Winnipeg
21st-century Canadian politicians